Ben Healy (born 11 September 2000) is an Irish cyclist, who currently rides for UCI WorldTeam . He was selected to compete in the road race at the 2020 UCI Road World Championships.

Major results

2017
 3rd Overall Giro di Basilicata
1st Mountains classification
1st Young rider classification
 4th Overall Ronde des Vallées
1st Young rider classification
2018
 1st  Time trial, National Junior Road Championships
 5th Overall Ronde des Vallées
 7th Overall Driedaagse van Axel
1st Stage 3
 9th Guido Reybrouck Classic
2019
 1st Stage 5 Tour de l'Avenir
 2nd Time trial, National Under-23 Road Championships
2020
 1st  Road race, National Road Championships
 1st  Time trial, National Under-23 Road Championships
 1st Stage 4 Ronde de l'Isard
2021
 1st Stage 10 Giro Ciclistico d'Italia 
 4th Time trial, National Road Championships
2022
 National Road Championships
1st  Time trial
3rd Road race
 6th Time trial, UEC European Road Championships
2023
 3rd Trofeo Calvia

References

External links

2000 births
Living people
Irish male cyclists
People from Kingswinford